Tiris (Arabic: تيرس) may refer to:

Geography
Tiris Zemmour
Tiris al-Gharbiyya (Western Tiris)

Other
Tiris (band)
TIRIS, Texas Instruments Registration and Identification System